Selim Aydemir (born 26 October 1990) is a German former professional footballer who played as a winger.

Career
On 15 March 2019, Aydemir joined Bosnian club NK Čelik Zenica on a contract for the rest of the season.

Aydemir returned to former club Rot-Weiß Erfurt, playing in the fifth-tier NOFV-Oberliga Süd, in January 2021, also taking on the role of an assistant coach.

He announced his retirement from playing due to health reasons in July 2020.

Personal life
Born in Germany, Aydemir is of Turkish descent.

References

External links
 
 

1990 births
Living people
Sportspeople from Kiel
Footballers from Schleswig-Holstein
German footballers
German people of Turkish descent
Association football forwards
Holstein Kiel players
SV Werder Bremen players
Eintracht Braunschweig players
Eintracht Braunschweig II players
Hallescher FC players
Chemnitzer FC players
VfR Aalen players
NK Čelik Zenica players
Büyükşehir Belediye Erzurumspor footballers
FC Rot-Weiß Erfurt players
Menemenspor footballers
2. Bundesliga players
3. Liga players
Regionalliga players
TFF First League players
German expatriate footballers
Expatriate footballers in Bosnia and Herzegovina